Meron Abraham Brhane (born 15 March 1995) is an Eritrean cyclist, who last rode for .

Major results

2015
 10th Critérium International de Blida
2016
 1st Stage 7 Tour du Faso
 4th Asmara Circuit
2017
 African Road Championships
1st  Team time trial (with Meron Teshome, Awet Habtom and Amanuel Ghebreigzabhier)
2nd  Road race
 National Road Championships
1st  Road race
6th Time trial
 1st Stage 7 La Tropicale Amissa Bongo
 3rd Massawa Circuit
2018
 2nd Overall Tour of Iran (Azerbaijan)

References

External links

1995 births
Living people
Eritrean male cyclists